Man with the Screaming Brain is a 2005 science fiction/slapstick film co-written, produced, directed, and starring Bruce Campbell. It is Campbell's feature film directorial debut. The film was co-written by David Goodman and co-stars Ted Raimi.

Plot 
Bruce Campbell plays William Cole, the wealthy CEO of a U.S. drug company who travels to Bulgaria with his wife, Jackie in the hopes of diversifying his company's financial interests. Cole is a stereotypical ugly American who constantly complains about the lack of Americanization of the former communist country. They're driven to a hotel by a taxi driver, and former KGB agent, named Yegor Stragov, in which Yegor gives William a ring to give to Jackie. While William is at the construction of a subway, Jackie secretly cheats on William with Yegor.

William gets back to the hotel and bumps into the hotel maid and gypsy, Tatoya, who kills men that date and dump her. Jackie then comes in, catches William kissing Tatoya and dumps him. William chases Tatoya, who had taken William's money and ring (which is revealed to be Tatoya's that she gave to Yegor when they dated), and Tatoya knocks him in the head with a pipe outside the hotel. Yegor witnesses this and so Tatoya kills Yegor with his own gun.

A vengeful Jackie has William’s life support plug pulled in hospital, and then goes to Gypsy Town where Tatoya lives and attempts to kill her, only to have Tatoya kill her by throwing her down a flight of stairs. Meanwhile, a still alive William wakes up in the warehouse of a Russian scientist named Dr. Ivan Ivanovich Ivanov, and his idiotic assistant Pavel, who had removed the damaged parts of William's brain and replaced it with healthy tissue from Yegor's. When William runs out of the warehouse, he discovers he can hear Yegor's voice in his head; together they both plan to "get the woman that killed us both". Jackie, who had also been picked up by Dr. Ivanov and Pavel, has her brain put inside a robot; and so she escapes and also plans to exact revenge on Tatoya.

William/Yegor and Robo-Jackie chase Tatoya around town. William gets involved in a car crash with his foot underneath a car and Tatoya makes another attempt to kill William by setting the leaking car gasoline alight. Jackie saves him and is presumed dead in the explosion. After avoiding some bar punks that believe William "raped Tatoya on her wedding day", William/Yegor begin suffering brain damage due to their cells not able to coexist in the same head. Jackie, who had survived the explosion, appears and attempts to kill Tatoya by throwing her off a bridge; until Tatoya stabs Jackie's brain, causing her to malfunction, and has Jackie thrown off the bridge. William chases Tatoya through the subway construction and the sewer and finally kills Tatoya by dropping her in sewer river, but not before taking back the ring. William and Jackie then confess their love for each other before Jackie's batteries finally die, as does William due to the brain cells of him and Yegor wearing out. Pavel brings William, Jackie and Tatoya's body back to Dr. Ivanov to fix them; as he had earlier found a way to make William and Yegor's brain cells coexist in the same head.

The movie ends with William back in the U.S. six months later, still sharing his body with Yegor's brain now completely synched and stabilized. He goes to a brain trauma benefit with Jackie, whose brain had been transferred into Tatoya's body.

Cast
 Bruce Campbell as William Cole
 Tamara Gorski as Tatoya
 Ted Raimi as Pavel
 Antoinette Byron as Jackie Cole
 Stacy Keach as Dr. Ivan Ivanovich Ivanov
 Vladimir Kolev as Yegor Stragov
 Valentine Glasbeily as Uri
 Velizar Binev as The Mayor
 Raicho Vasilev as The Bartender
 Jonas Talkington as Larry
 Mihail Elanov as Punk #1
 Neda Sokolovska as The Waitress
 Remington Franklin as Bar Punk
 Todor Nikolov as Doctor (uncredited)
 Yuri Safchev as Tatoya's Father (uncredited)

Production 
The Man with the Screaming Brain was originally supposed to take place in East L.A., but it was shot in Bulgaria instead, in order to save production costs. Campbell persuaded Syfy to let him rewrite the script so that it would be set in Bulgaria, instead of trying to make Bulgaria look like East L.A., which saved the production further money.

Release 
The production was financed in part by the Sci Fi Channel, where it was aired for the first time on television on September 25, 2005. It premiered on April 3, 2005 at the IHouse in Philadelphia, Pennsylvania. It was supposed to premiere that same night at the Broadway Theater in Pitman, New Jersey; however, that theater went bankrupt earlier in the week and a new venue was found (the IHouse).

Campbell then took the film with him on his book tour and it was shown at a limited number of theaters throughout the summer of 2005.

Reception 
Rotten Tomatoes, a review aggregator, reports that 33% of 12 surveyed critics gave the film a positive review; the average rating was 4.9/10. Joshua Siebalt of Dread Central rated it 3/5 stars and wrote, "The story is pretty ridiculous from start to finish, but that's not necessarily a bad thing since the film doesn't take itself seriously at all." Rob Gonsalves of eFilmCritic.com rated it 4/5 stars and called it "a decent and diverting piece of work from perhaps the hardest-working man in movies."

Negative reviews came from Dennis Harvey of Variety, who called it "a comedy that doesn't build, lacks structural integrity, and often falls flat. But it's also winningly loopy, with bizarre incidental ideas and performance riffing making for a series of parts that almost make up for the faults of the whole", and Mark de la Viña of San Jose Mercury News, who called it "an unapologetically sloppy jumble of Roger Corman-style antics that could only hope to inspire their own drinking game."

Adaptations
Dark Horse Comics published a four-issue comic book series based on the film.

References

External links

 SciFi Channel's site
 Commentary on the Premier

2005 films
2005 science fiction films
Dark Horse Comics titles
Dark Horse Comics characters
American science fiction comedy films
Films set in Bulgaria
Films shot in Bulgaria
Films directed by Bruce Campbell
Syfy original films
Films with screenplays by Sam Raimi
Films about organ transplantation
2005 directorial debut films
2000s American films